The Monsters Tour was the final comedy tour of British comedian Lee Evans .

The tour visited Bournemouth, Brighton, Nottingham, Sheffield, Birmingham, London, Manchester, Glasgow, Leeds, Aberdeen, Liverpool, Newcastle, Dublin, Belfast and Cardiff with tickets going on sale in late May 2013. The tour follows a fairly similar route to Evans' 2011 Roadrunner Tour.

A live DVD was recorded at the NIA, Birmingham on Saturday 20 September with Lee receiving a standing ovation following the finale.

On 20 November, Lee announced the tour to be his last ever, subsequently announcing his retirement from comedy.

Tour dates

References

External links
 leeevans.net – Official website of Lee Evans

Comedy tours